is a Japanese football player.

Career
Naoto Kidoku joined J2 League club Fagiano Okayama in 2013. In 2017, he moved to J3 League club SC Sagamihara.

References

External links

1994 births
Living people
Association football people from Yamanashi Prefecture
Japanese footballers
J2 League players
J3 League players
Fagiano Okayama players
SC Sagamihara players
Association football defenders